is a Japanese politician with the Kōmeitō political party. He has served in the House of Councillors as a national proportional representative since 2013.

References

1977 births
Living people
Komeito politicians
Members of the House of Councillors (Japan)